Kisa'i Marvazi (‎; 953–1002) was a 10th-century Persian poet.

His full name was probably Abu’l-Hasan (or Abu Ishaq) Majd al-Din ʿAli ibn Muhammad Kisāʾi (or Kasāʾi) Marvazi (according to Ali al-Bakharzi, author of Dumyat al-Qasr). Born in 953 CE and originating from Merv, he paid flattery first and foremost to the courts of the Samanids, but also to the Abbasids and Ghaznavids, particularly Mahmud of Ghazni.

He is said to have later converted to Shia Islam.

See also

List of Persian poets and authors
Persian literature

References

Bibliography 
 Jan Rypka, History of Iranian Literature. Reidel Publishing Company. 1968 . 
 Mohammad-Amin Riahi, Kisai Marvazi, his life and poetry, Tehran 1988

953 births
People from Merv
10th-century deaths
10th-century Persian-language poets
Persian-language literature